Gradac is a village in the municipality of Batočina, Serbia. According to the 2011 census, the village has a population of 206 people. The Gradac Cave located in the village is part of the Cultural Heritage of Serbia list, inscribed in 1979.

References

Populated places in Šumadija District
Batočina